The Nomenclature of Territorial Units for Statistics (NUTS) is a geocode standard for referencing the subdivisions of Estonia for statistical purposes. The standard is developed and regulated by the European Union. The NUTS standard is instrumental in delivering the European Union's Structural Funds. The NUTS code for Estonia is EE and a hierarchy of three levels is established by Eurostat. Below these is a further levels of geographic organisation - the local administrative unit (LAU). In Estonia, the LAU 1 is counties and the LAU 2 are municipalities.

Overall

NUTS Codes

Local administrative units

Below the NUTS levels, the two LAU (Local Administrative Units) levels are:

The LAU codes of Estonia can be downloaded here:

NUTS codes

NUTS 3 
EE0 Estonia
EE00 Estonia
EE001 Põhja-Eesti (Harju County)
EE004 Lääne-Eesti (Hiiu County, Lääne County, Pärnu County, Saare County)
EE006 Kesk-Eesti (Järva County, Lääne-Viru County, Rapla County)
EE007 Kirde-Eesti (Ida-Viru County)
EE008 Lõuna-Eesti (Jõgeva County, Põlva County, Tartu County, Valga County, Viljandi County, Võru County)

See also
 Subdivisions of Estonia
 ISO 3166-2 codes of Estonia
 FIPS region codes of Estonia

References

Sources
 Hierarchical list of the Nomenclature of territorial units for statistics - NUTS and the Statistical regions of Europe
 Overview map of EU Countries - NUTS level 1
 EESTI - NUTS level 2
 EESTI - NUTS level 3
 Correspondence between the NUTS levels and the national administrative units
 List of current NUTS codes
 Download current NUTS codes (ODS format)
 Counties of Estonia, Statoids.com

Estonia
Nuts
Reform in Estonia